Serra Yılmaz (born 13 September 1954) is a Turkish actress. She has appeared in more than forty films since 1983. On a number of films she collaborated with Ferzan Özpetek.

She plays the lead role in the theatre piece La Bastarda Di Istanbul, adapted from Elif Şafak's 2006 novel The Bastard of Istanbul and staged in March 2015 by Teatro di Rifredi in Florence, Italy.

In an interview, Yılmaz said that she was an atheist. In 1991, she was diagnosed with breast cancer and received treatment.

Selected filmography

References

External links

 

1954 births
Living people
Actresses from Istanbul
Turkish former Muslims
Turkish atheists
Turkish film actresses
Turkish stage actresses
20th-century Turkish actresses
21st-century Turkish actresses
Ciak d'oro winners